My Girl 2 is a 1994 American comedy-drama film starring Dan Aykroyd, Jamie Lee Curtis, Anna Chlumsky and Austin O'Brien. A sequel to My Girl (1991), its plot follows a now-teenaged Vada Sultenfuss, who travels from her home in suburban Pennsylvania to Los Angeles to find more information about her deceased mother.

A book based on the script was written by Patricia Hermes in 1994.

Plot
Vada Sultenfuss has matured from the spunky 11-year-old hypochondriac in 1972 to a more serious teenager in early 1974. Her father Harry and his new wife Shelly DeVoto, whom he dated in the first film, are expecting a baby, and they all still live in the Sultenfuss funeral parlor in Madison, Pennsylvania. To accommodate the new baby, Vada moves into her late Gramoo's old bedroom. She struggles with these adjustments, along with figuring boys out. One of them from school, Kevin, seems to like her friend Judy, but Vada wonders if he likes her, too. Both her father and Shelly try to give Vada some boy advice, but it backfires.

Vada receives a school assignment to write an essay on someone she admires but has never met. She decides to write about her late mother, Margaret Ann Muldovan (Maggie), but has few sources to go on, all confined to a small box. Among its contents are programs of plays her mother acted in, a passport, and a mystery paper bag with a date scribbled on it. Vada expresses her desire to travel someday, so Shelly concocts a plan for her to go to Los Angeles during her spring break, where she can stay with her uncle Phil and do research on her mother, who lived in L.A. growing up. Initially against the idea, believing Vada is too young to be traveling by herself, and fearing what might happen to her in L.A., Harry lets Vada take the five-day trip.

On arriving in L.A., Vada confronts a boy her age named Nick, who shows up at the airport instead of Phil. Nick is the son of Phil's new companion Rose, who runs a car repair shop where Phil is now a mechanic. Vada notices that her uncle has trouble with commitment, and that he and Rose live together. While annoyed at first about sacrificing his own spring break, Nick helps Vada with the difficult search of learning more about her mother by showing her around the city.

First planning to visit her mother's school, Vada discovers that it was destroyed in a fire. While a setback in her quest, she and Nick eventually track down a yearbook and meet several people who knew Maggie, including a police officer, photographer and film director. Vada also sees her favorite poet, Alfred Beidermeyer, who also lives in L.A., but after hearing his advice on not becoming a writer, she takes it hard. Later in the trip, Nick and Vada sneak out one evening to catch some Hollywood attractions, during which time Vada also gets her ears pierced, despite Nick's opposition to the custom.

Vada learns some shocking things about her mother, such as being suspended from school for smoking, and having another husband before her father named Jeffrey Pommeroy. Emotionally crushed by the latter, Vada worries that Jeffrey may actually be her father instead. Realizing he holds the key to more about her mother, but needing help from the police to locate him first, Vada goes to see Jeffrey, who instantly remembers Maggie. He provides Vada with valuable information for her essay, including a home movie and the answer behind the date written on the paper bag. Viewing the home movie touches Vada, as she watches her mother. Jeffrey also assures Vada that he is not her father.

Meanwhile, Phil tries to prove his love to Rose, after a man owning a fancy car repeatedly stops by the repair shop and tries to sweep her away by continuously flattering her. When Phil finally gets the courage to show how much she means to him, he proposes to her.

As Vada is ready to head home, she and Nick share a goodbye kiss at the airport before she boards the plane. Also, she notices a gift in her backpack from Nick—earrings. When she returns home, she finds out that Shelly just had the baby and heads to the hospital to see her new brother. To calm his crying, Vada, while holding him, sings "Smile", a song she heard her mother singing in the home movie. Vada receives an A+ on her essay, and hopes to share what she learned during her trip with her brother someday.

Cast
Dan Aykroyd as Harry Sultenfuss, Vada's father and director at Sultenfuss funeral parlor.
Jamie Lee Curtis as Shelly Sultenfuss, Vada’s stepmother and Harry's new wife who worked as his make-up artist in My Girl, before they were married.
Anna Chlumsky as Vada Sultenfuss, the main character, now thirteen years old.
Austin O'Brien as Nick Zsigmond, the son of Rose Zsigmond and Vada's special interest during her stay in Los Angeles.
Richard Masur as Phil Sultenfuss, Harry's brother who has moved to Los Angeles since My Girl and works as an auto mechanic.
Christine Ebersole as Rose Zsigmond, Phil's girlfriend who runs the auto shop he works at.
John David Souther as Jeffrey Pommeroy, the first husband of Vada's mother, Maggie Muldovan, a brief marriage.
Angeline Ball as Maggie Muldovan, Vada's mother (as seen in home movies Vada views when she visits Jeffrey).
Aubrey Morris as Alfred Beidermeyer, a poet and university professor who had Maggie as a student and whose work Vada admires.
Gerrit Graham as Dr. Sam Helburn, a cardiologist who frequently visits the auto shop, and captures Rose's attention.
Anthony R. Jones as Arthur, Harry's assistant at the funeral parlor.
Roland Thomson as Kevin Phillips, Vada's classmate.
Ben Stein as Stanley Rosenfeld, a photographer who knew Maggie in high school.
Keone Young as Daryl Tanaka, a police officer who knew Maggie in high school.
Richard Beymer as Peter Webb, a film director who knew Maggie.
Jodie Markell as Hillary Mitchell, a psychic who knew Maggie and also Jeffrey Pommeroy.

Release
The film debuted at number 4 at the U.S. box office, earning approximately $5 million during its opening weekend. It went on to gross $17,359,799 domestically and $11 million internationally for a worldwide gross of $28 million.

Critical response
My Girl 2 holds a 27% rating on Rotten Tomatoes based on fifteen reviews.

Peter Rainer of the Los Angeles Times was critical of the film, writing that its "dubious scenario is made even more so by the treacly approach of director Howard Zieff and screenwriter Janet Kovalcik. Everything in this film is sugared with sermons about the importance of Being Yourself. Vada doesn't experience any twinges of rage at the loss of her mother or any misgivings about her quest. She's preternaturally mature."

Stephen Holden of The New York Times, however, commended it as "appealingly sentimental," adding: "Where the first movie forced Vada to face some jarring realities (a best friend's death, a grandmother's senility) and was heavily salted with mortuary humor, the atmosphere of the sequel is softer and more golden. Among other things, the film is a nostalgic valentine to Los Angeles in palmier days when the city still wore the mystique of a laid-back, post-hippie lotus land."

Roger Ebert awarded the film two out of four stars, noting that it "seems inspired mostly by the opportunity to recycle the title of a successful film. Scrutinizing the popularity of the first film, perhaps the producers thought it depended on gentle sentimentality, in which a likable young girl deals with the loss of loved ones. As an idea for a series, this is fairly dangerous...  I think it's time to give Vada a break, before she becomes a necrophile, and starts spending all of her time upstairs like Emily Dickinson, writing bleak little poems." Joe Leydon of Variety deemed the film a "pleasant, painless and, as sequels go, genuinely ambitious," but conceded that it "may not be enough...  to broaden its appeal beyond its obvious target audience of preteen and young adolescent girls (and, of course, tag-along parents and boyfriends)."

Home media
Columbia-TriStar Home Entertainment released the film on VHS on June 11, 1996. It was released for the first time on DVD in the United States on December 3, 2002.

Awards
For her performance, Chlumsky won a Young Artist Award for "Best Performance by a Young Actress Starring in a Motion Picture"; Thomson and O'Brien were also nominated for Young Artist Awards for their roles.

Cancelled sequel
For several years Still My Girl was proposed as the third motion picture in the My Girl movie franchise and it was in development at Columbia Pictures. In his 2003 United Kingdom talk show interview with host Michael Parkinson, Dan Aykroyd stated that Columbia had an interest in getting this off the ground and strong interest in Anna Chlumsky returning to her role as Vada. In 2009, both Chlumsky and Aykroyd were still attached to the project but as the time passed it was becoming less and less likely that it would ever go into production. In April 2012, Chlumsky "put to rest" any rumors that such a film was in development.

References

External links

My Girl 2 script

1990s coming-of-age comedy-drama films
1990s romantic comedy-drama films
1994 films
American coming-of-age comedy-drama films
American pregnancy films
American romantic comedy-drama films
American sequel films
Columbia Pictures films
Films scored by Cliff Eidelman
Films directed by Howard Zieff
Films produced by Brian Grazer
Films set in 1974
Films set in Los Angeles
Films set in Pennsylvania
Funeral homes in fiction
Imagine Entertainment films
1990s English-language films
1990s American films